Garveia is a genus of cnidarians belonging to the family Bougainvilliidae.

The genus has cosmopolitan distribution.

Species:

Garveia annulata 
Garveia arborea 
Garveia belyaevi

References

Bougainvilliidae
Hydrozoan genera